Tokmanni Group Oyj is a Finnish retail chain, which is also the largest discount store chain in Finland in terms of net sales in 2019. Tokmanni is Finland's only nationwide discount store chain, and at the end of 2019 it had almost 200 stores around the country.

History 
The oldest Finnish low price chain of those who later went into Tokman, was Vapaa Valinta, founded in 1974 in Pirkkala of Juha and Paula Manninen. 

The Kyösti brothers and Kari Kokkonen founded in 1989 a discount store in Joensuu under the name Okman, which was renamed to Tokmanni in 1991. Later, other low-price chains were founded in the 1970s, for example, by Pirkko and Hannu Vuokila in 1978 founded Säästökuoppa in Oulu and by Seppo and Paavo Saastamoinen in 1979 founded Maxi-Makasini in Kajaani.  

During the 1980s, low-cost companies were founded throughout Finland, such as Tarjoustalo in Hyvinkää in 1980 by Arja and Kari Hautanen, Säästöpörssi in Karis in 1985 by Timo and Tapio Halme and Robinhood in 1988 by Seppo and Jukka Saastamoinen in Kouvola.   

The economic crisis in Finland in the early 1990s then led to many bankruptcies in the retail industry. In 2004, the Finnish private equity fund CapMan entered as the principal owner of Tokmanni. Thereafter, started a process with many acquisitions and mergers of companies began to a nationally active retail chain, with the beginning of the acquisition of 35 stores in Vapaa Valinta chain.    

During 2013 – 2015, Tokmanni implemented the brand harmonization, in which all the Group's stores were grouped under the Tokmanni brand.  

According to the 2018 annual report, Tokmanni is still striving to expand its store network. Tokmanni has divided its product group into six different divisions, which are food, home cleaning and personal hygiene, clothing, tools and electronics, home interior and garden, and leisure and home technology. In addition to consumer goods, Tokmanni stores usually also sell dry food, but the 15 stores also include fresh food. The chain's own brands include Iisi groceries and Priima foods. The company's product range consists of international and domestic brands, its own so-called private label brands (Iisi and Priima) and non-branded products. Tokmanni has a joint sourcing company in Shanghai with the Norwegian discount store Europris.

Tokmanni's five largest shareholders on 30 September 2019 were Takoa Invest, Elo, Varma, Ilmarinen and OP Financial Group. About 30 percent of the shares are nominee-registered.

References

External links 

 Tokmanni's investor site

Companies of Finland
Department stores of Finland
Discount stores
Companies listed on Nasdaq Helsinki